The Arkansas College of Osteopathic Medicine (ARCOM) is a private medical school in Fort Smith, Arkansas. Founded in 2014 as a division of the Arkansas Colleges of Health Education, the school is accredited by the American Osteopathic Association.

The school opened its doors to its inaugural class of 150 students in August 2017. Graduates of ARCOM will receive the Doctor of Osteopathic Medicine degree.

History
ARCOM opened in 2014, as the first in-state osteopathic medical school in the state of Arkansas, but after the New York Institute of Technology College of Osteopathic Medicine opened an additional location campus on the campus of Arkansas State University.  On July 1, 2016, the college received provisional accreditation from the American Osteopathic Association, permitting the school to begin recruiting students.  The college plans to develop residency training programs in cooperation with several hospital systems within the region.

Campus
The campus of ARCOM is located on 228 acres in Fort Smith, Arkansas.  Construction on the main building began in February 2016.  The building is a three-story 102,000 ft.² facility, with construction costs estimated at $32.4 million.

Academics
ARCOM confers the Doctor of Osteopathic Medicine degree.

See also
 List of medical schools in the United States

References

Further reading

External links
Arkansas College of Osteopathic Medicine

Osteopathic medical schools in the United States
Educational institutions established in 2014
Private universities and colleges in Arkansas
Medical schools in Arkansas
2014 establishments in Arkansas